Lake Goodwin or Goodwin Lake may refer to various lakes in the United States:

Populated place
Lake Goodwin, Washington, a census-designated place in Washington

Bodies of water
Goodwin Lake (Thurston County, Washington)
Lake Goodwin (Snohomish County, Washington)